Amir Omar was the City Councilman for Place 7 in Richardson, Texas. Omar is believed to be the first Muslim elected to political office in North Texas. Omar was elected to the Richardson City Council, Place 7 in May 2009, defeating incumbent Dennis Stewart by 51.54% to 48.46%.

In addition, American-Iranian groups believe that Omar is the first Iranian-American to be elected to a municipal office in Texas.

Upbringing
Amir Omar is the son of a Palestinian father and Iranian mother – "this could only happen in America" he wryly noted during the campaign. Compounding the improbability, one parent was Sunni and the other Shi'ite. His mother was an upper-middle class Iranian, his father a Palestinian villager of modest means. They met in Arizona, where their families had sent them for college.

Born in Milwaukee, Wisconsin, Omar was raised in South Texas in the Harlingen area. He attended Texas A&M University, and joined the Corps of Cadets. In addition, he operated a laundry business while in school, and graduated with a B.A. in 1996.

Political career
Omar ran for the Republican nomination for the US House of Representatives (Texas 30th District) in 2006 in southern Dallas County, but lost in the primary. He, however, received the endorsement of the Dallas Morning News, which stood him well in his later efforts.

Having moved to Richardson so that his son could attend the school he wanted, Omar set about learning about the city and the way it worked. He attended City Council meetings, Rotary meetings, and eventually decided to run for place 7 of the Richardson City Council, a seat that was held by Dennis Stewart, a retired Richardson police lieutenant who himself had been elected for the first time in 2007.

City Council Race in 2009
Place 7 of the Richardson City Council is one of three "at-large" positions. All voters vote for all seven Council places, but places 1 through 4 have residency requirements while officeholders in places 5, 6, and 7 can live anywhere in the city.

In 2007, Dennis Stewart, a Richardson police officer who retired as a lieutenant in 2004, ran against incumbent John Sweeden in Place 7 and pulled off an upset, defeating Sweeden by 50.84% to 49.16%. Stewart was part of the group of "new" Council members who elected Steve Mitchell as mayor in 2007, ending 16 years of Gary Slagel serving as mayor.

A group of Richardson residents, upset that Slagel had not been re-elected as mayor, founded a political action group called the Richardson Coalition. This group raised money to promote its agenda, emphasizing what it believed was right with the City. The group made no direct contributions to candidates, but published and mailed a controversial color voter's guide in which they endorsed a slate of candidates. The Coalition endorsed candidates opposing each of the Council members that ended Slagel's tenure as mayor in 2007 (except for Steve Mitchell, who was unopposed in 2009). In the case of Place 7, the Coalition endorsed newcomer Amir Omar over incumbent Dennis Stewart.

The fact that Omar is Muslim was a strong background issue. However, incumbent Dennis Stewart did not make an issue of Omar's religion in public and in fact referred to the nights that he as a Richardson police officer spent outside the mosque in the southeast Richardson after September 11, 2001, to ensure that there was no backlash against Muslims in Richardson because of the terror attacks.

According to the Dallas Morning News, Omar outspent and outworked incumbent Stewart, and won by 220 votes, 51.54% to 48.46%.

City Council Race in 2011
Prior to the 2011 City Council election, a local citizen group called the "Richardson Citizens Alliance" arose to combat the Richardson Coalition and to "oust" incumbents. This group originally tried to run a serious candidate against Omar, but switched that candidate to another place and persuaded neighborhood leader Diana Clawson to run against Omar.

Known mostly in her local neighborhood on the east side of Richardson, Ms. Clawson received less than a third of the vote against Omar, who won with 63% of the vote in a field of three (a third candidate, Alan North, did no campaigning at all yet still received over 4% of the vote).

City Council Race in 2013
On November 14, 2012, just days after Richardson voters approved a change in the city charter to elect the mayor directly, Omar announced his intention to run for mayor. Unlike other council members, Omar was forced to make a decision, because Place 7, the place that he held since 2009, was being converted to the mayor's place by the charter change approved by Richardson voters on November 6, 2012. Rather than run for a different place, Omar decided to run for his current place, but this time as mayor.

On May 11, 2013, Amir Omar lost the race for Place 7 (Mayor) to fellow Councilmember Laura Maczka by a 10,167 to 4,172 vote (70.90% to 29.10%).

Council  Assignments
Omar is the Council liaison to the Environmental Advisory Commission.

Omar is the Council liaison to the Retail Committee.

Omar is on the Methodist Richardson Medical Center Foundation board.

Accomplishments

As the Council liaison to the Environmental Advisory Commission, in 2010, Omar championed the "Tree The Town" initiative, a program in which upwards of 50,000 trees would be planted in Richardson over the next ten years.

In May 2012, Omar was selected by the non-profit One Man Dallas as "the man aged 24-44 who represents the best of DFW community engagement."

Education
Omar received a B.A. in Industrial Distribution from Texas A&M University in 1996.

References

External links
City of Richardson official website
Amir Omar on Twitter
Amir Omar website
Amir Omar 2009 campaign website

Living people
People from Richardson, Texas
Politicians from Milwaukee
Texas A&M University alumni
Texas city council members
Year of birth missing (living people)